Route 514, also known as Charlottetown Highway, is a  north-south Highway in southeastern Labrador in the Canadian province of Newfoundland and Labrador. It connects the towns of Charlottetown and Pinsent's Arm with the Trans-Labrador Highway (Route 510). The road is unpaved.

Route description

Route 514 begins at an intersection with Route 510 at Charlottetown Junction and its way northeast through remote hilly terrain for several kilometres, where it crosses a river and passes by several lakes. The highway now enters the Charlottetown town limits and now has intersection with a local road, Pinsent's Arm Road (Route 511-10), which provides access to the town of Pinsent's Arm. Route 514 now passes by the Charlottetown Airport before passing through neighbourhoods and coming to an end at a T-Intersection in downtown.

Major intersections

References

Labrador
514